Siyâvash is an Iranian legendary prince, and a major figure in Ferdowsi's epic the Shahnameh.

Siyavash, or Siavash, or other transliterations, may also refer to:

Siavash (name)
, an Iranian film
, an Iranian opera by Loris Tjeknavorian
Siyavush (play), an Azerbaijani play
, an Iranian video game
, a village in Nishapur County,  Razavi Khorasan province, Iran
Siyavash sniper rifle, an Iranian rifle

See also

Siyavuş Pasha (disambiguation), several Ottoman persons